Streptomyces canarius is a bacterium species from the genus of Streptomyces. Streptomyces canarius produces saphenamycin and canarius.

See also 
 List of Streptomyces species

References

Further reading 
 
 
 </ref>

External links
Type strain of Streptomyces canarius at BacDive – the Bacterial Diversity Metadatabase

canarius
Bacteria described in 1965